Sclavi or Sclavis may refer to:

 Sclavi (people), common Latin term for Slavic peoples
 "sclavi" is a plural form of "sclavus", a Latin word for slave
 Ezio Sclavi, an Italian footballer
 Tiziano Sclavi, an Italian comic book author
 Louis Sclavis, a French jazz musician

See also
 Sclavia (disambiguation)
 Sclavonia (disambiguation)
 Slavonia (disambiguation)
 Slavia (disambiguation)
 Slavi (disambiguation)